Hazel Mountain Walker (February 16, 1889 – May 16, 1980) was among the first African-American women to pass the Ohio bar.

Biography
She was born on February 16, 1889, in Warren, Ohio, to Charles Mountain and Alice Bronson. She graduated from the Cleveland Normal Training School and worked as an elementary school teacher from 1909 to 1936. She earned her law degree from the Baldwin-Wallace College in 1919 and was admitted that same year to practice law in Ohio. Deciding to forgo practicing as an attorney, Walker instead opted to provide educational services to the juvenile courts. Thus, Daisy D. Perkins (who was also admitted to practice law in 1919) has the distinction of being Ohio's first African-American female lawyer. Walker earned a bachelor's degree and master's degree in education from Western Reserve University respectively by 1941. She continued working in the educational field, and even served as the principal for several primary schools.

Walker died on May 16, 1980, in Cleveland, Ohio.

See also 
 List of first women lawyers and judges in Ohio

References

External links 

 Encyclopedia of Baldwin Wallace History: Hazel Walker

Ohio lawyers
African-American schoolteachers
1889 births
1980 deaths
20th-century American lawyers
20th-century African-American people